Los Angeles Metro most commonly refers to the Los Angeles County Metropolitan Transportation Authority, a regional transportation planning agency and public transportation operating agency.

Los Angeles Metro may also refer to:

Los Angeles Metro Rail
Metrolink (California)
Los Angeles metropolitan area